The Bezirksoberliga Oberbayern was the seventh tier of the German football league system in the Bavarian Regierungsbezirk of Upper Bavaria. Until the introduction of the 3. Liga in 2008 it was the sixth tier of the league system, until the introduction of the Regionalligas in 1994 the fifth tier.

The league was disbanded at the end of the 2011–12 season, when major changes to the Bavarian football league system were carried out. Above the Bezirksoberligas, the Landesligas were expanded in number from three to five divisions and the Bezirke have two to three regional leagues, the Bezirksligas, as its highest level again, similar to the system in place until 1988.

Overview
The Bezirksoberligas in Bavaria were introduced in 1988 to create a highest single-division playing level for each of the seven Regierungsbezirk. The term Bezirksoberliga translates roughly into County Premier League, a Regierungsbezirk being a similar administrative entity to a County. 

Before the introduction of the Bezirksoberligas, the Bezirksliga was the level of play below the Landesliga. The Bezirksligas Oberbayern-Nord, Oberbayern-Süd and Oberbayern-Ost fed the Landesliga Bayern-Süd as they afterwards feed the Bezirksoberliga Oberbayern.

The winner of the Bezirksoberliga Oberbayern, like the winner of the Bezirksoberliga Schwaben, was directly promoted to the Landesliga Bayern-Süd. The two second placed teams out of those leagues played-off for another promotion spot. The winner went to Landesliga, the loser faced the 15th placed team out of the Landesliga for the last spot there. However, in some years additional promotion places were available in the Landesliga.

The three bottom teams of the Bezirksoberliga were relegated to the Bezirksliga, the team just above those faced a play-off against the second placed Bezirksliga teams.

Some of the clubs in the west of Oberbayern actually play in the Schwaben football league system. This is mostly because before the border reform in the 1970s some actually had belonged to Schwaben. Being geographically closer to Augsburg then Munich also makes a difference.

Oberbayern is the only one of the seven Bezirke to have three Bezirksligas. The reason for this is the fact that it is the most populous. The Bavarian FA actually regulates, how many Bezirksligas a Bezirk needs to have, based on the number of clubs in the region.

With the league reform at the end of the 2011–12 season, which includes an expansion of the number of Landesligas from three to five, the Bezirksoberligas were disbanded. Instead, the Bezirksligas took the place of the Bezirksoberligas below the Landesligas once more.

The clubs from the Bezirksoberliga joined the following leagues:
 Champions: Promotion round to the Bayernliga, winners to the Bayernliga, losers to the Landesliga.
 Teams placed 2nd to 6th: Directly qualified to the Landesliga.
 Teams placed 7th to 12th: Three additional Landesliga places to be determined in a play-off round with the Bezirksliga champions, losers enter Bezirksliga.
 Teams placed 13th to 16th: Directly relegated to Bezirksligas

Top-three of the Bezirksoberliga
The top-three finishers in the league since its interception:

 Promoted teams in bold. 
 + Teams finished on equal points, decider needed to determine final position.

Multiple winners
Only two clubs have won the league more than once:

League placings
The final placings in the league since its interception:

Key

 S = No of seasons in league (as of 2011-12)

Notes
 1 Formed in a merger of MTV Ingolstadt and ESV Ingolstadt in 2004, FC Ingolstadt II took up the league place of the later.
 2 The football departments of FT Starnberg 09 merged with SpVgg Starnberg to form FC Starnberg in 1992. In 2001, the FC Starnberg was dissolved and the football department re-joined FT Starnberg 09.
 3 FC Schrobenhausen also played one season (2007-08) in the Bezirksoberliga Schwaben.
 4 The FSV München folded in 1999.
 5 Türk Gücü München folded in 2001 and reformed as Türkischer SV 1975 München. In 2009, the club merged with SV Ataspor to form SV Türkgücü-Ataspor München.

All-time table
As of 2011, the ASV Dachau leads the all-time table of this league, 74 points ahead of the 1. FC Traunstein, third placed is the TSV München-Grünwald. The SV Aubing holds the 83rd and last place with 11 points. For the 2011–12 season, only one club will be joining the league that has never done so before, the SV Manching.

References

Sources
 Die Bayernliga 1945 - 1997,  published by the DSFS, 1998
 50 Jahre Bayrischer Fussball-Verband  50-year-anniversary book of the Bavarian FA, publisher: Vindelica Verlag, published: 1996

External links 
 Bayrischer Fussball Verband (Bavarian FA)  
  Oberbayern branch of the Bavarian FA  
 Das deutsche Fussball Archiv  Historic German league tables
 Bavarian League tables and results  
 Website with tables and results from the Bavarian Oberliga to Bezirksliga  

Defunct football leagues in Bavaria
Football in Upper Bavaria
1988 establishments in West Germany
2012 disestablishments in Germany
Oberbayern
Sports leagues established in 1988